Ein Lord am Alexanderplatz (A Lord of Alexander Square) is an East German film. It was released in 1967.

External links
 

1967 films
East German films
1960s German-language films
Films set in Berlin
1960s German films